Ven may refer to:

Places
 Ven, Heeze-Leende, a hamlet in the Netherlands
 Ven (Sweden), an island
 Ven, Tajikistan, a town
 VEN or Venezuela

Other uses
 von Economo neurons, also called spindle neurons
 Vên, an EP by Eluveitie
 Ven (currency), the virtual currency used in Hub Culture
 Venerable or Ven.
 Ven or Ventus, a character from Kingdom Hearts
 The ven, a fictional race of near-human beings Houses of the Blooded and other games by John Wick